The Grove Methodist Church is a Grade II listed Methodist church in the village of Horsforth, Leeds, England, part of the Leeds South and West Methodist Circuit.

The predecessor of the present church, which opened on 11 May 1796, was located in New Street opposite the present church.

References

External links 
 The Grove Methodist Church
 

Churches in Leeds
Listed buildings in Leeds
Grade II listed churches in West Yorkshire
Methodist churches in West Yorkshire
Horsforth
Gothic Revival architecture in Leeds